Bartonella phoceensis is a bacterium from the genus Bartonella which was isolated from the blood of the rat Rattus norvegicus.

References

External links
Type strain of Bartonella phoceensis at BacDive -  the Bacterial Diversity Metadatabase
 

Bartonellaceae
Bacteria described in 2004